Bruno Luiz dos Santos, commonly known as Bruno Santos is a Brazilian footballer who plays as a left-back for Santo André.

He has previously represented Atlético Goianiense in 2018 Campeonato Brasileiro Série B, Macaé in 2015 Campeonato Brasileiro Série B and 2014 Campeonato Brasileiro Série C and Tupi in 2017 Campeonato Brasileiro Série C.

References

External links
 

Living people
1987 births
Brazilian footballers
Association football defenders
Bangu Atlético Clube players
America Football Club (RJ) players
Macaé Esporte Futebol Clube players
Cuiabá Esporte Clube players
Tupi Football Club players
Atlético Clube Goianiense players
Grêmio Esportivo Brasil players
Campeonato Brasileiro Série B players
Campeonato Brasileiro Série C players
Campeonato Brasileiro Série D players
People from Dourados
Sportspeople from Mato Grosso do Sul